Gliny may refer to the following places:
Gliny, Greater Poland Voivodeship (west-central Poland)
Gliny, Biłgoraj County in Lublin Voivodeship (east Poland)
Gliny, Chełm County in Lublin Voivodeship (east Poland)